Hnívan’ is a city in Tyvriv Raion, Vinnytsia Oblast, Ukraine. Population:

History

The year 1629 is mistakenly considered the date of the first written mention of the city to this day. This was facilitated by the mention of 1629 as the date of foundation in the multi-volume edition "History of Cities and Villages of the Ukrainian SSR", which was published during 1968–1973 by the Institute of History of the Academy of Sciences of Ukraine.

The settlement within the modern city of Hnivan (except for the territory of the village of Vytava) arose thanks to the laying of the Kyiv-Odesa railway in 1870 (it was then that the built station got the name of the nearest settlement – the village of Hnivan) and one of the largest landowners in Podolia, Yuzef (Josyp) Yaroshynskyi. In 1872, Józef Yaroshyński bought the village from the owner. The village of Tyt Shchenivskyi takes the equipment of the sugar factory and transports it to the purchased plot of land near the Gnivan station, where the sugar factory is being built.

There were 360 Jews living in the city before World War II, 11% of the total population. The city was under German occupation from 1941 to 1944.

Shortly after the start of the occupation, a group of Jewish men of Hnivan was shot in a military field. The rest of the Jews living in Hnivan were registered and forced to perform various kinds of hard labor. In the summer of 1942, about 90 Jews were murdered together with the Jews from neighbor villages in the same place. Today, the place of the shooting is on the grounds of a military base.

In 1913–1938, Gnivan was the village center. Since 1938, it has been an urban-type settlement.

In 1981, Gnivan received the status of a city.

In 2017, the Hnivan united territorial community was formed, which includes 4 administrative units – the city of Hnivan and the villages of Hryzhyntsi, Demydivka, Mohylivka, with the administrative center in the city of Hnivan. Before unification, the city was under the district administration from the time it was granted the status of a city (December 11, 1981). The city was formed on the basis of the territories of the urban-type settlement of Hnivan, the neighboring villages of Vytava and Vytavska Slobidka. Since 2017, Hnivan is the administrative center of Hnivan urban hromada.

Gallery

References

External links
 The murder of the Jews of Hnivan during World War II, at Yad Vashem website.

Cities in Vinnytsia Oblast
Cities of district significance in Ukraine
Populated places on the Southern Bug
Vinnitsky Uyezd
Holocaust locations in Ukraine